The 1896 United States presidential election in Wyoming took place on November 3, 1896, as part of the 1896 United States presidential election. State voters chose three representatives, or electors, to the Electoral College, who voted for president and vice president.

Wyoming was won by representative William Jennings Bryan (D–Nebraska), running with shipbuilder, railroad president and director, bank president Arthur Sewall, with 51.49 percent of the popular vote, against the 39th Governor of Ohio William McKinley (R–Ohio), running with New Jersey State Senator, Garret Hobart, with 47.75 percent of the popular vote.
This is also the only election where the Republican candidate won the election without Wyoming.

Electoral vote
Bryan's support for many Populist goals resulted in him being nominated by both the Democratic Party and the People's Party (Populists), though with different running mates.  One electoral vote from Wyoming was cast for the Populist Bryan-Watson ticket with Thomas E. Watson as vice president and two votes were cast for the Bryan-Sewall ticket.

Bryan would later lose Wyoming to William McKinley four year later and would later lose the state again to William Howard Taft in 1908.

Results

Results by county

See also
 United States presidential elections in Wyoming

Notes

References

Wyoming
1896
1896 Wyoming elections